Momčilo Bošković (born 6 October 1954) is a retired footballer who played as a midfielder for club sides in Yugoslavia, Greece and Portugal.

Club career
Bošković began playing football with FK Vojvodina and would spend most of his career in the Yugoslav First League with the club. He also had spells with FK Hajduk Kula, FK Vrbas, FK Budućnost Podgorica and FK Radnički Pirot.

Bošković moved to Greece in July 1979, joining Greek first division side Panachaiki F.C. Late in his career, he joined Sporting Clube de Portugal, but did not play in any matches with the first team.

References

External links

1951 births
Living people
Yugoslav footballers
FK Vojvodina players
FK Hajduk Kula players
FK Radnički Pirot players
FK Budućnost Podgorica players
Panachaiki F.C. players
Association football midfielders